Chris Thile & Brad Mehldau is an album by Chris Thile and Brad Mehldau. It was released by Nonesuch Records on January 27, 2017.

Background
Mandolinist and vocalist Chris Thile and pianist Brad Mehldau first played together in 2011 when Mehldau had a residency at London's Wigmore Hall. Their first tour as a duo was two years later. They performed together again in 2015, after which they recorded this studio album.

Music and recording
The album contains a mix of originals and covers. The latter "include Bob Dylan's 'Don't Think Twice It's Alright', Joni Mitchell's 'Marcie', Elliott Smith's 'Independence Day' as well as a composition by late 16th /early 17th century Irish harpist and composer Ruaidri Dáll Ó Catháin".

Thile's singing covers a range of effects, including "invoking an ethereal falsetto, the imploring call of a '50s teenage crooner, a nasal Dylanesque snarl, or a rural bluesman's grouchy defiance".

The music was recorded in Avatar Studios in New York City on December 30, 2015 and January 2–3, 2016. The album was released by Nonesuch Records on January 27, 2017. It is available as two CDs, two LPs, or as a download.

Reception

The Irish Times''' reviewer commented that the songs on the album "dig down into the roots of American music, touching the common ancestry of jazz and country but coming up fresh and turned boldly to the post-genre future".

Lloyd Sachs of JazzTimes stated "...this 64-minute, two-CD set is so idiosyncratic in its selection and treatment of material, it’s difficult to compare it to anything else... Throughout, the duo exploits the close relationship between keys and strings, achieving a seamless oneness on tunes such as Mehldau’s sprightly “Tallahassee Junction.” In exploring the world of Americana, Chris Thile & Brad Mehldau'' is sometimes cozy, sometimes haunting and sometimes, unexpectedly, both".

Track listing
Disc 1
 "The Old Shade Tree" (Brad Mehldau, Chris Thile) – 6:26 	
 "Tallahassee Junction" (Mehldau) – 5:54
 "Scarlet Town" (David Rawlings, Gillian Welch) – 6:03
 "I Cover the Waterfront" (Johnny Green, Edward Heyman) – 7:00
 "Independence Day" (Elliott Smith) – 3:10
 "Noise Machine" (Thile) – 4:50

Disc 2
 "The Watcher" (Mehldau) – 5:27
 "Daughter of Eve" (Thile) – 8:58 	
 "Marcie" (Joni Mitchell) – 4:50 	
 "Don't Think Twice, It's All Right" (Bob Dylan) – 6:02
 "Tabhair dom do Lámh" (Ruaidri Dáll Ó Catháin) – 4:19

LP bonus track: "Fast As You Can" (Fiona Apple) – 6:07 	

Source:

Personnel
 Chris Thile – mandolin, vocals
 Brad Mehldau – piano, vocals

Charts

References

Brad Mehldau albums
Chris Thile albums
Nonesuch Records albums
Collaborative albums